Alfredas Bumblauskas (born 18 November 1956) is a professor at Vilnius University and one of the best known Lithuanian historians.

After graduating from Žemaitė school in Telšiai, he enrolled in Vilnius University in 1974. Bumblauskas received his doctoral degree in 1987, and was mentored by Edvardas Gudavičius. He was formerly dean of the Faculty of History and now heads the Department of Theory of History and Cultural History at Vilnius University. He has sponsored and participated in several TV shows about history and culture. Bumblauskas has been a visiting scholar at the University of Helsinki, the University of Graz, and the University of Warsaw, and is a member of the editorial board of the Przegląd Wschodni.

He is the author of Senosios Lietuvos istorija 1009–1795 (A History of Old Lithuania: 1009–1795) published in Vilnius in 2005.

Awards and prizes
 The Knight's Cross of the Order of Vytautas the Great, Lithuania, 2003
 The Officer's Cross of the Order of Merit of Poland, Poland, 1999
 Presented with the Lithuanian National Prize of Culture and Art prize, 1998
 Presented with the Simonas Daukantas prize, 1999

References
Alfredas Bumblauskas CV 
A. Bumblauskas. Glimpses of Lithuanian History. In Lithuanian Philosophy: Persons and Ideas. Lithuanian Philosophical Studies, II. Ed. J. Baranova. CRVP, 2000, p. 21-25
A. Bumblauskas and others. Universitas Vilnensis 1579-2004. Vilnius, 2004
A. Bumblauskas. Lithuania’s Millennium –Millennium Lithuaniae Or What Lithuania Can Tell the World on this Occasion. Lietuvos istorijos studijos, 2009, t. 23, p. 127-158.
A. Bumblauskas. Millennium and the Grand Duchy of Lithuania, 2009

1956 births
Living people
People from Telšiai
Historians of Lithuania
20th-century Lithuanian historians
Recipients of the Lithuanian National Prize
Vilnius University alumni
Academic staff of Vilnius University
21st-century Lithuanian historians